The Estadi Municipal de Reus, also known as Estadi Camp Nou Municipal, is a multi-use stadium located in Reus, Catalonia, Spain. It is currently used for football matches and home games of the Barcelona Dragons in the European League of Football. It was the home stadium of CF Reus Deportiu.

History
Estadi Municipal was opened in October 1977 with the name of Camp Nou, being the new home stadium of CF Reus Deportiu and replacing Calle de Gaudí. Aside from the football stadium, the space also contains a rugby field and a multi-sport field.

On 26 May 2016, the Ajuntament of Reus announced an renovation to the stadium and its surroundings, including an adaptation to meet the LFP criteria.

In June 2018, the stadium hosted matches of the 2018 Mediterranean Games football tournament.

Beginning with the  inaugural season of the new European League of Football the Barcelona Dragons played all their home games at the stadium. Furthermore, the management came to an agreement with the municipality Reus to use their stadion for the 2022 and 2023 season.

References

External links
Reus Deportiu profile 
Estadios de España
Soccerway profile

Football venues in Catalonia
CF Reus Deportiu
Sports venues completed in 1977
1977 establishments in Spain
American football venues in Spain
Buildings and structures in Reus
European League of Football venues